Fenchone is an organic compound classified as a monoterpenoid and a ketone.  It is a colorless oily liquid.  It has a structure and an odor similar to those of camphor. Fenchone is a constituent of absinthe and the essential oil of fennel. Fenchone is used as a flavor in foods and in perfumery.

Other names for fenchone include dl-fenchone and (±)-fenchone. It is a mixture of the enantiomers d-fenchone and l-fenchone. Other names for d-fenchone include (+)-fenchone and (1S,4R)-fenchone. Other names for l-fenchone include (−)-fenchone and (1R,4S)-fenchone. The d-fenchone enantiomer occurs in pure form in wild, bitter and sweet fennel plants and seeds, whereas the l-fenchone enantiomer occurs in pure form in wormwood, tansy, and cedarleaf.

References

Absinthe
Ketones
Monoterpenes
Cyclopentanes